The 2009–10 New Zealand V8 season was the eleventh season of the series, under the NZV8 guise. The season began at Pukekohe on 8 November 2009 and finished at the Hamilton Street Circuit on 18 April 2010 after six championship meetings, and a season-ending non-championship event.

Teams and drivers
 All teams must adhere to the series' car specification rules. All Holdens must be based upon the body shells of its VT, VX or VY Commodores, with upgrades available to replicate it to a VZ or VE. Similarly for Ford, their cars must be based upon the AU Falcon, with options to replicate the BA.

Calendar

 The non-championship round was a support race to V8 Supercars at the Hamilton 400.

Championship standings

References

External links
 The official website of NZV8

NZ Touring Cars Championship seasons
V8 season
V8 season